Stefan Csorich (25 September 1921 – 15 July 2008) was a Polish ice hockey player. He played for KTH Krynica during his career. He also played for the Polish national team at the 1948 and 1952 Winter Olympics, and several World Championships. After his playing career he turned to coaching. He won the 1950 Polish league championship with Krynica. During the Second World War Csorich was captured during the invasion of Poland and interned in Hungary, before getting to France and subsequently the United Kingdom, serving in both their militaries, while also briefly playing hockey in Scotland.

In 2004 he was awarded the Officer's Cross of the Order of Polonia Restituta, in recognition of his services.

References

External links
 

1921 births
2008 deaths
Ice hockey players at the 1948 Winter Olympics
Ice hockey players at the 1952 Winter Olympics
KTH Krynica players
Officers of the Order of Polonia Restituta
Olympic ice hockey players of Poland
Polish ice hockey coaches
Polish ice hockey defencemen
Sportspeople from Nowy Sącz